D.I.Y. America is a 2009 web video documentary series by director Aaron Rose which  premiered  on December 1, 2009, on Wieden+Kennedy Entertainment's website.

Subject Matter

The series is a documentary based exploration into the American subcultures of skateboarding, graffiti, street art, punk and hip hop, focusing on topics like creativity and perseverance.

D.I.Y. America was assembled using additional footage shot, but never included, in Beautiful Losers.

Episode list

References

External links
D.I.Y. America on YouTube
Show summary and credits

American documentary films
Documentary films about visual artists